Anacaona was a Taíno queen.

Anacaona may also refer to:

 Anacaona (band), a Cuban band
 Anacaona (insect), a genus of coneheads in the tribe Copiphorini
 Anacaona (plant), a genus of plants in the family Cucurbitaceae